Los Palmitos is a town and municipality located in the Sucre Department, northern Colombia.

References
 Gobernacion de Sucre - Los Palmitos
 Los Palmitos official website

Sucre